Polydamas of Pharsalus (Ancient Greek: Πολυδάμας, gen. Πολυδάμαντος, Polydámas, Polydámantos) was a Thessalian statesman. He was entrusted by his fellow-citizens about 375 BC, with the supreme government of their native town. Polydamas formed an alliance with Sparta, with which state his family had long been connected by the bonds of public hospitality (proxeny), but he soon after entered into a treaty with Jason of Pherae. On the murder of Jason in  370 BC, his brother Polyphron, who succeeded to his power, put to death Polydamas and eight other most distinguished citizens of Pharsalus.

References
 

4th-century BC Greek people
Ancient Thessalian statesmen
Proxenoi
People from Farsala